Siah Kamar-e Sofla (also Romanized as Sīāh Kamar-e Soflá; also known as Sīāh Kamar-e Morād Pāshābī and Sīāh Kamar-e Pā'īn) is a village in Mahidasht Rural District, Mahidasht District, Kermanshah County, Kermanshah Province, Iran. At the 2006 census, its population was 123, in 31 families.

References 

Populated places in Kermanshah County